Klaus Lang (born 26 April 1971 in Graz) is an Austrian composer, concert organist, improviser, and academic teacher.

His opera Die Architektur des Regens (The Architecture of Rain) after the Noh play Shiga by Zeami was premiered at the Munich Biennale in 2008.

In 2006, Lang was appointed Professor of composition at the University of Music and Performing Arts, Graz. In 2010 he was awarded the Andrzej-Dobrowolski-Preis of the Steiermark.

He was commissioned by Katharina Wagner to write an opera, The Vanished Wedding, to be premiered at Bayreuth, although not at the Festspielhaus and not part of the Bayreuth Festival.  It is claimed to be the first world premiere at Bayreuth since the premiere of Wagner's Parsifal in 1882. The Vanished Wedding was premiered at the Reichshof, a disused Bayreuth cinema, on 23 July 2018, the day before the start of the 2018 Bayreuth Festival.

References

External links 
 
Klaus Lang - recordings on Kairos 
Klaus Lang - Wendy Network 
Klaus Lang - bandcamp 
Klaus Lang - music austria 

Austrian opera composers
Male opera composers
Austrian classical organists
Austrian classical composers
Male conductors (music)
Academic staff of the University of Music and Performing Arts Graz
20th-century classical composers
21st-century classical composers
1971 births
Composers from Graz
Living people
Austrian male classical composers
20th-century Austrian conductors (music)
20th-century Austrian male musicians
21st-century Austrian conductors (music)
21st-century organists
20th-century Austrian composers
21st-century male musicians
Musicians from Graz